Fimbristylis ammobia is a sedge of the family Cyperaceae that is native to Australia.

It blooms between March and July and produces brown flowers.

In Western Australia it is found in the Kimberley region where it grows in red sandy soils around sandstone.

References

Plants described in 1979
Flora of Western Australia
ammobia